The Western Eagles Football Netball Club is an Australian rules football and netball club which competes in the Colac DFL  since 1996.
They are based in the Victorian town of Irrewillipe. Irrewillipe is about twelve miles east of Colac .

History
The Western Eagles Football Club has competed in the Colac DFL  since 1996. They are the result of a merger between the Pirron Yallock Football club and the Irrewillipe Football clubs in 1996. Both clubs were members of the Colac DFL until rural decline forced the clubs to merge because of lack of players.

Since the merge the club has made the finals on four occasions, 1998, 1999 2001 and 2004. Since then the club has struggled on the field, finishing last or second last every year since 2006. They have won only fourteen games in their last 118 matches.

Former clubs

Bibliography
 Cat Country - History of Football In The Geelong Region by John Stoward - 
 Football Country Style: a history of football in the Colac District from 1900-1974 - Bill Doran

References

External links 
 Western Eagles FNC on AFL National
 Gameday website

Australian rules football clubs in Victoria (Australia)
Netball teams in Victoria (Australia)
Multi-sport clubs in Australia
Australian rules football clubs established in 1996
1996 establishments in Australia